The following are the national records in Olympic weightlifting in Bangladesh. Records are maintained in each weight class for the snatch lift, clean and jerk lift, and the total for both lifts by the Bangladesh Weightlifting Federation.

Current records

Men

Women

References

Bangladesh
weightlifting